

Events

Pre-1600
1229 – The Sixth Crusade: Frederick II, Holy Roman Emperor, signs a ten-year truce with al-Kamil, regaining Jerusalem, Nazareth, and Bethlehem with neither military engagements nor support from the papacy.
1268 – The Battle of Wesenberg is fought between the Livonian Order and Dovmont of Pskov.
1332 – Amda Seyon I, Emperor of Ethiopia begins his campaigns in the southern Muslim provinces.
1478 – George, Duke of Clarence, convicted of treason against his older brother Edward IV of England, is executed in private at the Tower of London.

1601–1900
1637 – Eighty Years' War: Off the coast of Cornwall, England, a Spanish fleet intercepts an important Anglo-Dutch merchant convoy of 44 vessels escorted by six warships, destroying or capturing 20 of them.
1735 – The ballad opera called Flora, or Hob in the Well went down in history as the first opera of any kind to be produced in North America (Charleston, S.C.) 
1781 – Fourth Anglo-Dutch War: Captain Thomas Shirley opens his expedition against Dutch colonial outposts on the Gold Coast of Africa (present-day Ghana).
1791 – Congress passes a law admitting the state of Vermont to the Union, effective 4 March, after that state had existed for 14 years as a de facto independent largely unrecognized state.
1797 – French Revolutionary Wars: Sir Ralph Abercromby and a fleet of 18 British warships invade Trinidad.
1814 – Napoleonic Wars: The Battle of Montereau.
1861 – In Montgomery, Alabama, Jefferson Davis is inaugurated as the provisional President of the Confederate States of America.
  1861   – With Italian unification almost complete, Victor Emmanuel II of Piedmont, Savoy and Sardinia assumes the title of King of Italy.
1873 – Bulgarian revolutionary leader Vasil Levski is executed by hanging in Sofia by the Ottoman authorities.
1878 – John Tunstall is murdered by outlaw Jesse Evans, sparking the Lincoln County War in Lincoln County, New Mexico.
1885 – Adventures of Huckleberry Finn by Mark Twain is published in the United States.
1900 – Second Boer War: Imperial forces suffer their worst single-day loss of life on Bloody Sunday, the first day of the Battle of Paardeberg.

1901–present
1906 – Édouard de Laveleye forms the Belgian Olympic Committee in Brussels.
1915 – U-boat Campaign: The Imperial German Navy institutes unrestricted submarine warfare in the waters around Great Britain and Ireland.
1930 – While studying photographs taken in January, Clyde Tombaugh discovers Pluto.
  1930   – Elm Farm Ollie becomes the first cow to fly in a fixed-wing aircraft and also the first cow to be milked in an aircraft.
1932 – The Empire of Japan creates the independent state of Manzhouguo (the obsolete Chinese name for Manchuria) free from the Republic of China and installed former Chinese Emperor Aisin Gioro Puyi as Chief Executive of the State.
1938 – Second Sino-Japanese War: During the Nanking Massacre, the Nanking Safety Zone International Committee is renamed "Nanking International Rescue Committee", and the safety zone in place for refugees falls apart.
1942 – World War II: The Imperial Japanese Army begins the systematic extermination of perceived hostile elements among the Chinese in Singapore.
1943 – World War II: The Nazis arrest the members of the White Rose movement.
  1943   – World War II: Joseph Goebbels delivers his Sportpalast speech.
1946 – Sailors of the Royal Indian Navy mutiny in Bombay harbour, from where the action spreads throughout the Provinces of British India, involving 78 ships, twenty shore establishments and 20,000 sailors
1947 – First Indochina War: The French gain complete control of Hanoi after forcing the Viet Minh to withdraw to mountains.
1954 – The first Church of Scientology is established in Los Angeles.
1955 – Operation Teapot: Teapot test shot "Wasp" is successfully detonated at the Nevada Test Site with a yield of 1.2 kilotons.  Wasp is the first of fourteen shots in the Teapot series.
1957 – Kenyan rebel leader Dedan Kimathi is executed by the British colonial government.
  1957   – Walter James Bolton becomes the last person legally executed in New Zealand.
1965 – The Gambia becomes independent from the United Kingdom.
1970 – The Chicago Seven are found not guilty of conspiring to incite riots at the 1968 Democratic National Convention.
1972 – The California Supreme Court in the case of People v. Anderson, (6 Cal.3d 628) invalidates the state's death penalty and commutes the sentences of all death row inmates to life imprisonment.
1977 – A thousand armed soldiers raid Kalakuta Republic, the commune of Nigerian singer Fela Kuti, leading to the death of Funmilayo Anikulapo Kuti.
1977 – The Space Shuttle Enterprise test vehicle is carried on its maiden "flight" on top of a Boeing 747.
1979 – Richard Petty wins a then-record sixth Daytona 500 after leaders Donnie Allison and Cale Yarborough crash on the final lap of the first NASCAR race televised live flag-to-flag.
1983 – Thirteen people die and one is seriously injured in the Wah Mee massacre in Seattle. It is said to be the largest robbery-motivated mass-murder in U.S. history.
1991 – The IRA explodes bombs in the early morning at Paddington station and Victoria station in London.
2001 – FBI agent Robert Hanssen is arrested for spying for the Soviet Union. He is ultimately convicted and sentenced to life imprisonment.
  2001   – Sampit conflict: Inter-ethnic violence between Dayaks and Madurese breaks out in Sampit, Central Kalimantan, Indonesia, ultimately resulting in more than 500 deaths and 100,000 Madurese displaced from their homes.
2003 – 192 people die when an arsonist sets fire to a subway train in Daegu, South Korea.
2004 – Up to 295 people, including nearly 200 rescue workers, die near Nishapur, Iran, when a runaway freight train carrying sulfur, petrol and fertilizer catches fire and explodes.
2010 – WikiLeaks publishes the first of hundreds of thousands of classified documents disclosed by the soldier now known as Chelsea Manning.
2013 – Armed robbers steal a haul of diamonds worth $50 million during a raid at Brussels Airport in Belgium.
2014 – At least 76 people are killed and hundreds are injured in clashes between riot police and demonstrators in Kyiv, Ukraine.
2018 – 66 people die when Iran Aseman Airlines Flight 3704 crashes in the Dena sub-range in the Zagros Mountains of Iran.
2021 – Perseverance, a Mars rover designed to explore Jezero crater on Mars, as part of NASA's Mars 2020 mission, lands successfully.

Births

Pre-1600
1201 – Nasir al-Din al-Tusi, Persian scientist and writer (d. 1274)
1372 – Ibn Hajar al-Asqalani, Egyptian jurist and scholar (d. 1448)
1486 – Chaitanya Mahaprabhu, Indian monk and saint (d. 1534)
1516 – Mary I of England (d. 1558)
1530 – Uesugi Kenshin, Japanese daimyō (d. 1578)
1543 – Charles III, Duke of Lorraine (d. 1608)
1547 – Bahāʾ al-dīn al-ʿĀmilī, founder of Isfahan School of Islamic Philosophy (d. 1621)
1559 – Isaac Casaubon, Swiss philologist and scholar (d. 1614)
1589 – Henry Vane the Elder, English politician (d. 1655)
  1589   – Maarten Gerritsz Vries, Dutch explorer (d. 1646)

1601–1900
1602 – Per Brahe the Younger, Swedish soldier and politician, Governor-General of Finland (d. 1680)
  1602   – Michelangelo Cerquozzi, Italian painter (d. 1660)
1609 – Edward Hyde, 1st Earl of Clarendon, English historian and politician, Chancellor of the Exchequer (d. 1674)
1626 – Francesco Redi, Italian physician (d. 1697)
1632 – Giovanni Battista Vitali, Italian violinist and composer (d. 1692)
1642 – Marie Champmeslé, French actress (d. 1698)
1658 – Charles-Irénée Castel de Saint-Pierre, French philosopher and author (d. 1743)
1732 – Johann Christian Kittel, German organist and composer (d. 1809)
1745 – Alessandro Volta, Italian physicist, invented the battery (d. 1827)
1754 – Emanuel Granberg, Finnish church painter (d. 1797)
1814 – Samuel Fenton Cary, American lawyer and politician (d. 1900)
1817 – Lewis Armistead, American general (d. 1863)
1818 – John O'Shanassy, Irish-Australian politician, 2nd Premier of Victoria (d. 1883)
1836 – Ramakrishna Paramahamsa, Indian mystic and yogi (d. 1886)
1838 – Ernst Mach, Austrian physicist and philosopher (d. 1916)
1846 – Wilson Barrett, English actor, playwright, and manager (d. 1904)
1848 – Louis Comfort Tiffany, American stained glass artist (d. 1933)
1849 – Alexander Kielland, Norwegian author, playwright, and politician (d. 1906)
1850 – George Henschel, German-English singer-songwriter, pianist, and conductor (d. 1934)
1855 – Jean Jules Jusserand, French historian, author, and diplomat, French Ambassador to the United States (d. 1932)
1860 – Anders Zorn, Swedish artist (d. 1920) 
1862 – Charles M. Schwab, American businessman, co-founded Bethlehem Steel (d. 1939)
1867 – Hedwig Courths-Mahler, German writer (d. 1950)
1870 – William Laurel Harris, American painter and author (d. 1924)
1871 – Harry Brearley, English inventor (d. 1948)
1883 – Nikos Kazantzakis, Greek philosopher, author, and playwright (d. 1957)
1885 – Henri Laurens, French sculptor and illustrator (d. 1954)
1893 – Maksim Haretski, Belarusian prose writer, journalist and activist (d. 1938)
1890 – Edward Arnold, American actor (d. 1956)
  1890   – Adolphe Menjou, American actor (d. 1963)
1892 – Wendell Willkie, American captain, lawyer, and politician (d. 1944)
1896 – Li Linsi, Chinese educator and diplomat (d. 1970) 
1898 – Luis Muñoz Marín, Puerto Rican poet and politician, 1st Governor of the Commonwealth of Puerto Rico (d. 1980)
1899 – Arthur Bryant, English historian and journalist (d. 1985)

1901–present
1903 – Nikolai Podgorny, Ukrainian engineer and politician (d. 1983)
1906 – Hans Asperger, Austrian pediatrician and academic (d. 1980)
1909 – Wallace Stegner, American novelist, short story writer, and essayist (d. 1993)
1914 – Pee Wee King, American singer-songwriter and fiddler (d. 2000)
1915 – Phyllis Calvert, English actress (d. 2002)
1919 – Jack Palance, American boxer and actor (d. 2006)
1920 – Rolande Falcinelli, French organist, pianist, composer, and pedagogue (d. 2006)
1921 – Mary Amdur, American toxicologist and public health researcher (d. 1998)
  1921   – Oscar Feltsman, Ukrainian-Russian pianist and composer (d. 2013)
1922 – Eric Gairy, Grenadan politician, 1st Prime Minister of Grenada (d. 1997)
  1922   – Helen Gurley Brown, American journalist and author (d. 2012)
  1922   – Connie Wisniewski, American baseball player (d. 1995)
1925 – George Kennedy, American actor (d. 2016)
1926 – Wallace Berman, American painter and illustrator (d. 1976)
1927 – Fazal Mahmood, Pakistani cricketer (d. 2005)
1928 – Rex Mossop, Australian rugby player and sportscaster
1929 – Len Deighton, English historian and author
  1929   – André Mathieu, Canadian pianist and composer (d. 1968)
1931 – Johnny Hart, American cartoonist, co-created The Wizard of Id (d. 2007)
  1931   – Toni Morrison, American novelist and editor, Nobel Prize laureate (d. 2019).
1932 – Miloš Forman, Czech-American actor, director, and screenwriter (d. 2018)
1933 – Yoko Ono, Japanese-American multimedia artist and musician 
  1933   – Bobby Robson, English international footballer and international manager (d. 2009)
  1933   – Mary Ure, Scottish-English actress (d. 1975)
1934 – Audre Lorde, American writer and activist (d. 1992)
1939 – Claude Ake, Nigerian political scientist and academic (d. 1996)
1940 – Fabrizio De André, Italian singer-songwriter and guitarist (d. 1999)
  1940   – Prue Leith, English restaurateur and journalist
1946 – Michael Buerk, English journalist
1947 – Dennis DeYoung, American musician, singer, and songwriter
1950 – Nana Amba Eyiaba I, Ghanaian queen mother and advocate
  1950   – John Hughes, American director, producer, and screenwriter (d. 2009)
  1950   – Cybill Shepherd, American actress
1951 – Queen Komal of Nepal
  1951   – Isabel Preysler, Filipino-Spanish journalist
1952 – Randy Crawford, American jazz and R&B singer
  1952   – Juice Newton, American singer-songwriter and guitarist
1954 – Charlie Fowler, American mountaineer, author, and photographer (d. 2006)
  1954   – John Travolta, American actor, singer and producer 
1955 – Lisa See, American writer and novelist
1957 – Marita Koch, German sprinter
  1957   – Vanna White, American television personality
1960 – Greta Scacchi, Italian-Australian actress
1964 – Matt Dillon, American actor
1965 – Dr. Dre, American rapper, record producer, and entrepreneur
1966 – Phillip DeFreitas, Dominican-English cricketer 
1967 – Roberto Baggio, Italian international footballer
  1967   – Colin Jackson, Welsh sprinter and hurdler
1968 – Molly Ringwald, American actress
1970 – James H. Fowler, American political scientist and author
1971 – Thomas Bjørn, Danish golfer
1974 – Carrie Ann Baade, American painter and academic
  1974   – Radek Černý, Czech international footballer
  1974   – Julia Butterfly Hill, American environmentalist and author
  1974   – Jillian Michaels, American personal trainer and television personality
  1974   – Leilani Maaja Münter, American environmental activist and former professional race car driver
1975 – Gary Neville, English international footballer
1980 – Regina Spektor, Russian-American musician and songwriter
1982 – Christian Tiffert, German footballer
1983 – Jermaine Jenas, English international footballer
1990 – Monica Aksamit, American Olympic saber fencer
1991 – Sebastian Neumann, German footballer
  1991   – Jeremy Allen White, American actor
1992 – Le'Veon Bell, American football player
1998 – Bailey Simonsson, Australian-New Zealand rugby league player

Deaths

Pre-1600
 675 – Colmán, bishop of Lindisfarne
 814 – Angilbert, Frankish monk and diplomat (b. 760)
 901 – Thābit ibn Qurra, Arab astronomer and physician (b. 826)
999 – Gregory V, pope of the Catholic Church (b. 972)
1139 – Yaropolk II, Grand Prince of Kiev (b. 1082)
1218 – Berthold V, duke of Zähringen (b. 1160)
1225 – Hugh Bigod, 3rd Earl of Norfolk, Norman nobleman
1294 – Kublai Khan, Mongol emperor (b. 1215)
1379 – Albert II, duke of Mecklenburg (b. 1318)
1397 – Enguerrand VII, French nobleman (b. 1340)
1455 – Fra Angelico, Italian priest and painter (b. 1395)
1478 – George Plantagenet, 1st Duke of Clarence, English nobleman (b. 1449)
1502 – Hedwig Jagiellon, duchess of Bavaria (b. 1457)
1535 – Heinrich Cornelius Agrippa, German magician, astrologer, and theologian (b. 1486)
1546 – Martin Luther, German priest and theologian, leader of the Protestant Reformation (b. 1483)
1564 – Michelangelo, Italian sculptor and painter (b. 1475)

1601–1900
1654 – Jean-Louis Guez de Balzac, French author (b. 1594)
1658 – John Villiers, 1st Viscount Purbeck, English courtier (b. c. 1591)
1683 – Nicolaes Pieterszoon Berchem, Dutch painter (b. 1620)
1695 – William Phips, governor of Massachusetts (b. 1650)
1712 – Louis, Dauphin of France, (b. 1682)
1743 – Anna Maria Luisa de' Medici, Italian noble (b. 1667)
1748 – Otto Ferdinand von Abensberg und Traun, Austrian field marshal (b. 1677)
1772 – Count Johann Hartwig Ernst von Bernstorff, Danish politician (b. 1712)
1778 – Joseph Marie Terray, French economist and politician, Controller-General of Finances (b. 1715)
1780 – Kristijonas Donelaitis, Lithuanian pastor and poet (b. 1714)
1788 – John Whitehurst, English geologist and clockmaker (b. 1713)
1803 – Johann Wilhelm Ludwig Gleim, German poet and educator (b. 1719)
1851 – Carl Gustav Jacob Jacobi, German mathematician and academic (b. 1804)
1873 – Vasil Levski, Bulgarian activist, founded the Internal Revolutionary Organization (b. 1837)
1880 – Nikolay Zinin, Russian organic chemist (b. 1812)
1893 – Serranus Clinton Hastings, American lawyer and politician, 1st Chief Justice of California (b. 1814)

1901–present
1902 – Charles Lewis Tiffany, American businessman, founded Tiffany & Co. (b. 1812)
1910 – Lucy Stanton, American activist (b. 1831)
1915 – Frank James, American soldier and criminal (b. 1843)
1933 – James J. Corbett, American boxer and actor (b. 1866)
1938 – David King Udall, American missionary and politician (b. 1851)
1956 – Gustave Charpentier, French composer (b. 1860)
1960 – Gertrude Vanderbilt, American stage actress (b. ) 
1966 – Grigory Nelyubov, Soviet pilot and military officer (b. 1934)
1967 – J. Robert Oppenheimer, American physicist and academic (b. 1904)
1969 – Dragiša Cvetković, Serbian lawyer and politician, 17th Prime Minister of Yugoslavia (b. 1893)
1977 – Andy Devine, American actor (b. 1905)
1981 – Jack Northrop, American engineer and businessman, founded the Northrop Corporation (b. 1895)
1982 – Ngaio Marsh, New Zealand author (b. 1895)
2001 – Balthus, Polish-Swiss painter and illustrator (b. 1908)
  2001   – Dale Earnhardt, American racer and NASCAR seven times champion (b. 1951)
2014 – Mavis Gallant, Canadian-French author and playwright (b. 1922)
  2014   – Maria Franziska von Trapp, Austrian-American singer (b. 1914)
2015 – Elchanan Heilprin, Czechoslovakian-born English rabbi (b. 1920 or 1922)
2019 – Alessandro Mendini, Italian designer and architect (b. 1931)
2020 – Flavio Bucci, Italian actor and voice actor (b. 1947)

Holidays and observances
Christian feast day:
Bernadette Soubirous (France)
Colmán of Lindisfarne
Flavian of Constantinople
Geltrude Comensoli
Simeon of Jerusalem (Western Christianity)
February 18 (Eastern Orthodox liturgics)
Dialect Day (Amami Islands, Japan)
Independence Day, celebrates the independence of the Gambia from the United Kingdom in 1965
Kurdish Students Union Day (Iraqi Kurdistan)
National Democracy Day, celebrates the 1951 overthrow of the Rana dynasty (Nepal)

References

External links

 BBC: On This Day
 
 Historical Events on February 18

Days of the year
February